Pitcairnia spectabilis is a plant species in the genus Pitcairnia. This species is native to Ecuador.

References

spectabilis
Flora of Ecuador